The FIL European Luge Championships 1974 took place in Imst, Austria for the third time after previously hosting the event in 1956 and 1971.

Men's singles

Women's singles

Men's doubles

Medal table

References
Men's doubles European champions
Men's singles European champions
Women's singles European champions

FIL European Luge Championships
1974 in luge
Luge in Austria
1974 in Austrian sport